Valentine Blake Dillon (1847 – 31 March 1904) was an Irish lawyer and politician.

Valentine Blake Dillon was a nephew of John Blake Dillon and cousin of John Dillon. He qualified as a solicitor in 1870, and took part in many high-profile trials, including those related to the Land War.

In 1891 he was the Parnellite candidate in the closely fought North Sligo by-election, but failed to win the seat. He later acted as election agent for James McCann in his successful campaign to win Dublin St Stephen's Green, a seat hitherto held by the Conservatives, and for his successor, Laurence Waldron.

From 1894 to 1895, he was Lord Mayor of Dublin.

References

1845 births
1904 deaths
Lord Mayors of Dublin
Irish Nationalist politicians